Romani Hansen is a U.S. Virgin Islander basketball player.

College career
In June 2016, he signed with Pensacola State College. 

In 2018-19, Hansen also played one season at Savannah State (SSU) where he averaged 9.5 points, 5.5 rebounds and one assist during the 2018-19 season. He led the team with 27 blocks, tied for the team lead with 67 made free throws and shot 44 percent from the field.
Hansen had a career-highs of 20 points against Morgan State and 11 rebounds against Delaware State.

U.S. Virgin Islands national team
Hansen has represented the U.S. Virgin Islands national team on several occasions.

References

External links
Profile at Eurobasket.com
FIBA profile at 2023 FIBA Basketball World Cup qualification
Profile at ScoutBasketball.com

1997 births
Living people
Forwards (basketball)
People from Saint Croix, U.S. Virgin Islands
Albany Great Danes men's basketball players 
Pensacola State Pirates men's basketball players
Savannah State Tigers basketball players
Starwings Basel players
United States Virgin Islands men's basketball players
United States Virgin Islands expatriate sportspeople